Issam Fayel Al-Sinani (born 14 August 1984), commonly known as Issam Fayel, is an Omani footballer.

Club career
On 8 July 2014 he signed a one-year contract with 2013–14 Oman Professional League champions Al-Nahda Club.

Club career statistics

International career
Issam was selected for the national team for the first time in 2007. He has made appearances in the 2007 AFC Asian Cup and the 2010 FIFA World Cup qualification.

Honours

Club
With Al-Nahda
Oman Super Cup (1): 2014

References

External links

1984 births
Living people
People from Sur, Oman
Omani footballers
Oman international footballers
Omani expatriate footballers
Association football defenders
2007 AFC Asian Cup players
Sur SC players
Al Jahra SC players
Kazma SC players
Al-Nasr SC (Kuwait) players
Al-Nahda Club (Oman) players
Oman Professional League players
Expatriate footballers in Kuwait
Omani expatriate sportspeople in Kuwait
Kuwait Premier League players